Viola uliginosa is a species of flowering plant belonging to the family Violaceae.
Common name swamp violet.
It is native to Europe.

References

uliginosa
Taxa named by Wilibald Swibert Joseph Gottlieb von Besser